John Thompson Drew (1796 – August 25, 1865) was a mixed blood military and political leader of the Cherokee Nation. Born in 1796, there is little written about his life until he led a company of Cherokee emigrants from Georgia to Indian Territory. The Cherokee Encyclopedia states that he was a participant in the Battle of Claremore Mound in 1818. He is best known for joining the Confederate Army at the outbreak of the American Civil War, when he raised, organized and led the  1st Cherokee Mounted Rifles. He moved his home from the Cherokee Nation to the Chickasaw Nation near the end of the war to escape intra-tribal bloodshed.

Emigration to Indian Territory
The last of thirteen groups to embark from the Southeast for Indian Territory was led by John Drew. This group, which included Chief John Ross and his family, traveled by flatboat down the Hiwassee and the Tennessee Rivers. They departed from the Cherokee Agency on December 7, 1838. The trip was especially difficult because extreme drought in that year had caused a major drop in water level along the Tennessee.

Slave revolt of 1842
By November, 1842, he had become a captain in the Cherokee Militia. On November 15, 1842, a group of at least 25 black slaves escaped from the plantation of Joseph Vann near Webbers Falls and fled in the direction of Mexico, where slavery had already been outlawed. The Cherokee National Council resolved, and Chief John Ross approved that the Cherokee Militia, commanded by Drew, pursue the fleeing slaves. Drew raised a company of 100 men to arrest the fugitive slaves and return them to Fort Gibson. The militia left Talequah on November 21. The runaways were starving and submitted to Drew and his men, who returned them to Fort Gibson on December 7.

Civil War service
Drew may be best known for his founding of the 1st Cherokee Mounted Rifles, a military unit that fought on the side of the Confederate States of America (CSA) in the American Civil War. The unit was composed of full-blood Cherokees, who typically owned no slaves and had little sympathy for Southern white people. Drew, however, did own enslaved people and Drew's command included many enslaved people.

Drew's unit, under the command of Colonel Douglas Cooper was ordered to attack a large party of pro-Union Creeks, led by their chief, Opothleyahola, who were encamped on Bird Creek, near the present city of Tulsa. However, most of Drew's soldiers did not want to fight their former friends. Instead of preparing to charge the Creek camp, the majority of Cherokees simply deserted. Only Drew and 28 of his men remained with Cooper and the Confederates. Drew remained loyal to the Confederate cause. Principal Chief John Ross pardoned and promised amnesty to those who had deserted.

Personal
In 1864, when it was apparent that the Confederate cause would be defeated by the Union, Drew moved into the Chickasaw Nation, closer to the northern border of Texas. He moved back to his former plantation only after the Confederate surrender.
John Drew contracted lung fever near the end of the Civil War and died of the disease at Fort Gibson on August 25, 1865. He was buried on his estate at Bayou Menard, in present-day Muskogee County, Oklahoma.

Notes

References 

1796 births
1865 deaths
Cherokee Confederates
Cherokee Nation people (1794–1907)
Cherokee slave owners
Confederate States Army officers
People of Indian Territory
Deaths from pneumonia in Oklahoma